was a sergeant in the Imperial Japanese Army (IJA) during the Second World War, and was one of the last three Japanese holdouts to be found after the end of hostilities in 1945. He was discovered in the jungles of Guam on 24 January 1972, almost 28 years after U.S. forces had regained control of the island in 1944.

Early life
Yokoi was born in Saori, Aichi Prefecture, Japan. He was an apprentice tailor when he was conscripted in 1941.

War years and post-war survival

Initially, Yokoi served with the 29th Infantry Division in Manchukuo. In 1943, he was transferred to the 38th Regiment in the Mariana Islands and arrived on Guam in February 1943. When American forces captured the island in the 1944 Battle of Guam, Yokoi went into hiding with nine other Japanese soldiers. Seven of the original ten eventually moved away and only three remained in the region. These men separated, but visited each other periodically until about 1964, when the other two died in a flood. For the last eight years, Yokoi lived alone. He survived by hunting, primarily at night. He also used native plants to make clothes, bedding, and storage implements, which he carefully hid in his cave. He hid in the jungle, fearing he might be captured by American soldiers occupying the southern islands of Japan.

Discovery

On the evening of 24 January 1972, Yokoi was discovered by two local men checking shrimp traps along a small river on Talofofo. They had assumed Yokoi was a villager from Talofofo, but he thought his life was in danger and attacked them.  They managed to subdue him and carried him out of the jungle.

Yokoi later said that he expected the local men to kill him at first but was surprised when instead they allowed him to eat hot soup at their home before turning him over to the authorities. He was in relatively good health, but slightly anemic due to a lack of salt in his diet according to doctors at Guam Memorial Hospital. His diet included wild nuts, mangos, papaya, shrimp, snails, frogs, and rats.

"It is with much embarrassment that I return," he said upon his return to Japan in March 1972. The remark quickly became a popular saying in Japan.
He had known since 1952 that World War II had ended but feared coming out of hiding, explaining that "We Japanese soldiers were told to prefer death to the disgrace of getting captured alive."

Yokoi was one of the last three Japanese "holdout" soldiers discovered.

Later life

After a whirlwind media tour of Japan, Yokoi married and settled down in rural Aichi Prefecture.  He became a popular television personality and an advocate of simple living.  He was featured in a 1977 documentary film called Yokoi and His Twenty-Eight Years of Secret Life on Guam.  He eventually received the equivalent of US$300 in back pay, and a small pension.  Although he never met Emperor Shōwa, while visiting the grounds of the Imperial Palace, Yokoi said, "Your Majesties, I have returned home ... I deeply regret that I could not serve you well. The world has certainly changed, but my determination to serve you will never change."

Yokoi died in 1997 of a heart attack at the age of 82, and was buried at a Nagoya cemetery, under a gravestone that had originally been commissioned by his mother in 1955, after Yokoi had been officially declared dead.

Museum
The Shoichi Yokoi Memorial Hall opened in 2006 in Nakagawa-ku, Nagoya. Admission is free.

See also

 Hiroo Onoda, among the last three Japanese holdouts to be found after the war; he was discovered in March 1974, Lubang Island, Philippines
 Teruo Nakamura, the last known Japanese holdout to surrender; he was discovered in December 1974, Morotai Island, Indonesia
 List of solved missing person cases

Notes

References
 Hatashin, Omi and Shoichi Yokoi (2009). Private Yokoi's War and Life on Guam, 1944–72: The Story of the Japanese Imperial Army's Longest WWII Survivor in the Field and Later Life. London: Global Oriental. ; .
 Mendoza, Patrick M. (1999).  Extraordinary People in Extraordinary Times: Heroes, Sheroes, and Villains. Englewood, Colorado: Libraries Unlimited; .

External links

 "Thirty Years in the Jungle! Could you do it?"—a  short biography.
 A photo of the entrance to Yokoi's cave
 Shoichi Yokoi Memorial Hall
 The exhibition of Shoichi Yokoi's tools in jungle for 28 years / Nagoya City Museum 
 Shoichi Yokoi, the Japanese soldier who held out in Guam / By Mike Lanchin BBC World Service
 Shoichi Yokoi marries (video)

1915 births
1997 deaths
Formerly missing people
Japanese holdouts
Imperial Japanese Army personnel of World War II
Military personnel from Aichi Prefecture
Missing person cases in Japan
Talofofo, Guam
Imperial Japanese Army soldiers